Phoemela Baranda (born October 1, 1980) is a Filipina model, actress and was the entertainment anchor of ABS-CBN's weekday flagship news broadcast of TV Patrol. She is a former officer and currently a member of Professional Models Association of the Philippines (PMAP) and appears regularly on magazine covers and advertising campaigns. She has currently already appeared in 5 Tagalog movies, 4 TV series' and was once a host for the Philippine reality show Extra, Extra. Recently in 2008, she was a contestant in the Philippine version of Fear Factor.

Career
Baranda started modelling when she was 13 years old, joining the clothing brand Pink Soda's club search where she was selected. Her first commercial was for Extraderm, a line of facial products. After her runner-up finish at the 1994 Philippine search for the Elite Model Look in 1994, she continued her modeling stints in ramp, mainstream media advertising campaigns and print media, appearing on the covers of the local editions of Uno, Cosmopolitan, Seventeen, T3, Mega Magazine, Preview, Marie Claire and Maxim.

In 2000, she briefly played a minor part in the Philippine television series Pangako sa ’Yo, which she quickly followed up with Cool Dudes. In 2003 she played Esmeralda in the GMA series Narito ang Puso Ko. She got her first hosting stint in Extra Challenge when she did a successful audition when Miriam Quiambao left the reality show in 2003. She has then transferred to ABS-CBN as a segment host for the showbiz gossip show The Buzz, which paved the way for her next project on TV Patrol.

Baranda placed 23rd in the FHM 100 Sexiest Women of the World in 2006; she has also placed 48th in 2003, 29th in 2004, 49th in 2005, and 79th in 2007.

Personal life
Baranda has a bachelor's degree in Interdisciplinary Studies, having graduated from De La Salle-College of Saint Benilde in 2001. She lives an active lifestyle engaging in physical activities such as going to the gym and bikram yoga, she is also active in sports particularly badminton and squash where she has placed in several local open tournaments.

She has one child, Nichole, whom she had at age 19. Nichole gained fame after joining Pinoy Big Brother: All In'' as a teen housemate.

Baranda has been in a longtime relationship with businessman and professional race car driver Jason Choachuy. In November 2020, she announced that the couple were expecting their first child together, due in March 2021.

Filmography

Film

Television

References

External links

1980 births
Living people
Filipino television presenters
Filipino women television presenters
Participants in Philippine reality television series
De La Salle–College of Saint Benilde alumni
ABS-CBN News and Current Affairs people
GMA Integrated News and Public Affairs people
Viva Artists Agency